Kikwete Bridge is a bridge across the Malagarasi River in Tanzania.

It was officially opened on September 16, 2015 by President Jakaya Kikwete, whose name it bears.

References

Bridges in Tanzania
Bridge